Manuel Pérez de Guzmán y Pimentel, 12th Duke of Medina Sidonia (1671–1721) became Duke of Medina Sidonia in 1713.

He was married in 1687, aged 16, to the 17-year-old Luisa Maria de Silva Mendoza. She was a daughter of Gregorio Maria Domingo, the 5th Duke of Pastrana, 5th Duke of Estremera and 9th Duke of el Infantado. They had 10 children.

The duke was awarded the title of a Knight of the Order of the Golden Fleece, and served as Captain General of Catalonia between 1690 and 1693.

1671 births
1721 deaths
Captains General of Catalonia
Dukes of Medina Sidonia
Medina Sidonia
Medina Sidonia